Chiruromys lamia, also known as the lamia or the broad-headed tree mouse, is a species of rodent found chiefly in southeastern New Guinea.

References

lamia
Mammals of Papua New Guinea
Mammals described in 1897
Taxa named by Oldfield Thomas